Second Honeymoon is a 1937 screwball romantic comedy directed by Walter Lang and starring Tyrone Power and Loretta Young in the main roles. Based on a story by Philip Wylie.

In 1942, Twentieth Century-Fox released another film based on the same source, entitled Springtime in the Rockies, which was directed by Irving Cummings and starred Betty Grable, John Payne, Carmen Miranda and Cesar Romero.

Plot
The newly remarried Vicky (Loretta Young) is on vacation in Miami Beach with her second husband Bob Benton (Lyle Talbot) a Yale-man. One night Vicky finds her first husband Raoul McLiesh (Tyrone Power) on the terrace of the ballroom, and they skip between kissing as if they never divorced and the distant way of two not married people. 
As he is introduced to her second husband Bob, they have a certain complicity against Vicky, and McLiesh not only finds himself with a valet - Leo MacTavish (Stuart Erwin) - but also with a raccoon, sent him from Bob. He decides to stay at the hotel as his first wife seems more beautiful than ever.
The next evening McLiesh brings a young girl - a cigarette-girl met on the road somewhere, Joy (Marjorie Weaver), who makes Vicky jealous, as her husband flirts with her.
While businessman husband Bob has to leave, Vicky and Raoul get closer.

"You're the only real thing that ever happened to me. Don't let me go this time, please don't!", Vicky says one night to Raoul. And while Raoul's valet Leo McTavish marries Joy, Bob, Vicky and Raoul are in a storm of emotions trying to find their way to one or another.

Cast
 Tyrone Power as Raoul McLiesh
 Loretta Young as Vicky
 Stuart Erwin as Leo MacTavish
 Claire Trevor as Marcia
 Marjorie Weaver as Joy
 Lyle Talbot as Bob Benton
 J. Edward Bromberg as Herbie
 Paul Hurst as Dennis Huggins
 Jayne Regan as Paula
 Hal K. Dawson as Andy
 Mary Treen as Elsie

External links

 

1937 films
American black-and-white films
Films directed by Walter Lang
Films set in Miami
American screwball comedy films
1937 romantic comedy films
20th Century Fox films
Films based on works by Philip Wylie
American romantic comedy films
Films with screenplays by Kathryn Scola
1930s American films